I Wonder may refer to:

Songs
 "I Wonder" (1944 song), a song by Pvt. Cecil Gant; covered by Roosevelt Sykes (1945) and several others
 "I Wonder" (Kanye West song), 2007
 "I Wonder" (Kellie Pickler song), 2007
 "I Wonder" (Rosanne Cash song), 1982
 "I Wonder (Departure)", by ABBA, 1977
 "I Wonder", by Blind Melon from Blind Melon, 1992
 "I Wonder", by Chris Isaak from the Tin Cup film soundtrack, 1996
 "I Wonder..." by Da Pump, 2000
 "I Wonder", by Diffuser from Making the Grade, 2003
 "I Wonder", by Golden Earring from Miracle Mirror, 2009 reissue
 "I Wonder", by Gotthard from Lipservice, 2005
 "I Wonder", by Great Gable from Tracing Faces, 2020
 "I Wonder", by Pitbull from M.I.A.M.I., 2004
 "I Wonder", by Sixto Rodriguez from Cold Fact, 1970
 "I Wonder", from the film Sleeping Beauty, 1959
 "I Wonder", written by Irving Berlin

Other uses
 "I wonder, I wonder?", a phrase used by Rena Ryūgū in the anime Higurashi When They Cry